Dadra and Nagar Haveli and Daman and Diu is a union territory in India. The territory was constituted through the merger of the former territories of Dadra and Nagar Haveli and Daman and Diu. Plans for the proposed merger were announced by the Government of India in July 2019; the necessary legislation was passed in the Parliament of India in December 2019 and came into effect on 26 January 2020. The territory is made up of four separate geographical entities: Dadra, Nagar Haveli, Daman, and the island of Diu. All four areas were part of Portuguese Goa and Daman with the former joint capital in Panjim, they came under Indian rule in the mid-20th century after the Annexation of Goa. These were jointly administered as Goa, Daman and Diu until 1987, when Goa was granted statehood after the Konkani language agitation. The current capital is Daman and Silvassa is the largest city.

History
Daman and Diu were Portuguese colonies from the 1520s until annexed by India on 19 December 1961. Dadra and Nagar Haveli were invaded by the Indian Army on 11 August 1961. Portugal officially recognised Indian sovereignty over the areas in 1974 following the Carnation Revolution.

Daman and Diu were administered as part of the union territory of Goa, Daman and Diu between 1962 and 1987, becoming a separate union territory when Goa was granted statehood.

In July 2019, the Government of India proposed merging the two territories into a single union territory in order to reduce duplication of services and reduce the cost of administration. Legislation to this effect, the Dadra and Nagar Haveli and Daman and Diu (Merger of Union territories) Bill, 2019, was tabled in the Parliament of India on 26 November 2019 and assented to by the President of India on 9 December 2019. The two union territories had previously shared a common administrator and government officials. The town of Daman was chosen to be the capital of the new combined union territory. The appointed day for the act to come into effect was notified as 26 January 2020 by the Government of India.

Geography

Dadra and Nagar Haveli and Daman and Diu is composed of four distinct areas located in Western India. Dadra is a small enclave within the state of Gujarat. Nagar Haveli is a C shaped enclave located between the states of Gujarat and Maharashtra which contains a counter enclave of Gujarat around the village of Maghval. Daman is an enclave on the coast of Gujarat and Diu is an island off the coast of Gujarat.

Administration

Dadra and Nagar Haveli and Daman and Diu is administered as a union territory of India by virtue of Article 240 (2) of the Constitution of India. The President of India appoints an administrator to administer the territory on behalf of the central Government of India. The central government may appoint advisers to assist the administrator with his duties.

Districts

The union territory is made up of three districts:

Law enforcement and justice
Law enforcement within the territory is the responsibility of the Dadra and Nagar Haveli and Daman and Diu Police. The territory falls under the jurisdiction of the Bombay High Court.

In the Parliament of India
Dadra and Nagar Haveli and Daman and Diu sends two members (MPs) to the lower house of the Indian parliament the Lok Sabha. The territory is divided into the constituencies of Daman and Diu and Dadra and Nagar Haveli.

Demographics

Religion

See also 
 Goan Civil Code
 Goa, Daman and Diu
 Portuguese India
2019 Daman Indigenous Land Clearing Protests

References

External links
Dadra and Nagar Haveli and Daman and Diu Administration
Dadra and Nagar Haveli and Daman and Diu Tourism

 
Union territories of India
Former colonies in Asia
Former Portuguese colonies
Former countries in South Asia
States and union territories of India
States and territories established in 2020
2020 establishments in India
India–Portugal relations
Enclaves and exclaves